James C. Loveless (March 4, 1907 – September 9, 1997) was an American football and basketball coach and college athletic administrator.
He served as the head football coach at Grove City College from 1937 to 1953.

References

1907 births
1997 deaths
American men's basketball players
Basketball coaches from Indiana
Cleveland Browns scouts
DePauw Tigers athletic directors
DePauw Tigers football players
DePauw Tigers men's basketball players
Grove City Wolverines football coaches
Grove City Wolverines men's basketball coaches
Southeastern Oklahoma State Savage Storm football coaches
College swimming coaches in the United States
College track and field coaches in the United States
High school football coaches in Indiana
People from Gibson County, Indiana
Players of American football from Indiana
Basketball players from Indiana